Jack Carr is an American author of thriller novels and former Navy SEAL.

Biography 
Carr presently lives in Park City, Utah with his wife and children.

Awards and honors

Adaptations 
Carr's debut novel, The Terminal List was adapted into a television series starring Chris Pratt. The series was released on Amazon Prime Video on July 1, 2022.

Publications

The Terminal List series 

 The Terminal List (2018)
 True Believer (2019)
 Savage Son (2020)
 The Devil's Hand (2021)
 In the Blood (2022)
 Only the Dead (2023)

References

External links 

 Official website

Writers from Utah
American mystery writers